USM may stand for:

General topics 
 Samui Airport, in Thailand (IATA airport code)
 Ultimate Soccer Manager
 Ultimate Spider-Man
 Ultrasonic motor, the motor drive used in some Canon EF and EF-S lenses
 Union of Monaco Trade Unions (Union des Syndicats de Monaco)
 United States Marines
 United States of Mexico
 United States Military
 United States Mint
 United States of Mind, a studio album by the band Covenant
 Unlisted Securities Market
 Unsharp masking, an image processing method
 United Socialist Movement, UK, 1934-1965
 Ultrasonic machining

Computing 
 Universal Storage Media a type of devices that, when connected to a computer, show up as storage devices without the need for additional drivers
 Universal Storage Module a new standard for cableless plug-in slot-powered storage for consumer electronics devices
 User-based Security Model a security standard for the Simple Network Management Protocol (SNMP)
 Universal Subscription Mechanism a protocol for the Rich Site Summary (RSS) standard

Universities 
 University System of Maryland
 University School of Milwaukee
 University of Santa Monica
 Universiti Sains Malaysia, Penang, Malaysia
 University of Southern Maine
 University of Southern Mindanao, Philippines
 University of Southern Mississippi
 Federico Santa María Technical University (also known as UTFSM or USM)

See also 
 Carter USM